The Niavaran Palace Complex ( – Majmue ye Niāvarān) is a historical palace complex situated in Shemiran (northern Tehran), Iran. It consists of several palace buildings and monuments dating back to the Qajar and Pahlavi eras.

History
The complex traces its origin to a garden in the region of Niavaran, which was used as a summer residence by Fath-Ali Shah (1772–1834) of the Qajar dynasty.

A pavilion was built in the garden by the order of Naser ed Din Shah (1831–1896) of the same dynasty, which was initially referred to as Niavaran, and was later renamed Saheb Qaranie. The pavilion of Ahmad Shah Qajar (1898–1930) was built in the late Qajar period.

During the reign of the Pahlavi Dynasty, a new palace named Niavaran was built for the imperial family of Mohammad Reza Shah (1919–1980). The palace was designed in 1958 and completed in 1967. It served a variety of purposes for the imperial court including as a home for the Shah and Empress as well a place to entertain visiting foreign heads of state. On New Year's Eve 1977, the reception and state banquet for US President Jimmy Carter took place here.

The Shah and Empress left basically everything behind when they left Iran in January 1979. All of the peripheral buildings of the Saheb Qaranie, with the exception of the Ahmad Shahi Pavilion, were demolished, and the present-day structures were built to the north of the Saheb Qaranie. The Ahmad Shahi Pavilion was then used as an exhibition centre for presents from world leaders to the Iranian imperial monarchs.

Private library
Private library of the Niavaran Palace Complex is a historical complex remaining from the Qajar and Pahlavi periods. The library was established by Empress Farah and consists of about 23,000 books, mostly in the Persian and French languages, and specialises in books related to philosophy.

The library was publicly inaugurated in 1994, on the occasion of International Museum Day.

Construction
The interior designing of the library was designed by architect Aziz Farmanfarmayan. It has dissimilar features from the point of view of architecture and constructional structure, and was built based on the contemporary architecture prevailing in the 1970s.

The building's design was materialized with a combination of bronze and special glass. About 300 well-lit cylinders supply the needed lighting of the library.

The library was fully reorganized after twenty five months of practical and hard attempt.

Features
The building is allocated to libraries in three separate levels; the reading room, the main library, and the audio visual room. In addition, the library includes an underground basement for storing paintings and other artifacts.

Other sections of the library include sets of artwork, which number over 350. The works reflect parts of modern art history, particularly the modern tendencies of Iranian art in the 1950s and 1960s.

Gallery

Gallery

See also
Architecture of Iran
Cultural Heritage Organization of Iran
Golestan Palace
Sa'dabad Complex

References

External links

 Niavaran Cultural Historic Complex

Palaces in Tehran
Royal residences in Iran
National museums of Iran
Houses completed in 1968
Persian gardens in Iran
Museums in Tehran
Historic house museums in Iran
Palaces in Iran